Women's suffrage in Canada occurred at different times in different jurisdictions to different demographics of women. Women's right to vote began in the three prairie provinces. In 1916, suffrage was earned by women in Manitoba, Saskatchewan, and Alberta. The federal government granted limited war-time suffrage to some women in 1917 and followed with full suffrage in 1918, at least, granting it on same basis as men, that is, certain races and status were excluded from voting in federal elections prior to 1960. 

By the close of 1922, all the Canadian provinces, except Quebec, had granted full suffrage to White and Black women, yet Asian and Indigenous women still could not vote. In Newfoundland, at that time a separate dominion, women earned suffrage in 1925 for women not Asian and not Indigenous. Women in Quebec, who were not Asian and not Indigenous, did not gain full suffrage until 1940.

Municipal suffrage was earned in 1884 to property-owning widows and spinsters in the provinces of Quebec and Ontario; in 1886, in the province of New Brunswick, to all property-owning women except those whose husbands were voters; in Nova Scotia, in 1886; and in Prince Edward Island, in 1888, to property-owning widows and spinsters. 

Asian women (and men) were not granted suffrage until after World War II in 1948, Inuit women (and men) were not granted suffrage until 1950, and it was not until 1960 that suffrage (in Federal elections) was extended to First Nations women (and men) without requiring them to give up their treaty status. Incarcerated women (and men) serving sentences fewer than two years in length were granted suffrage in 1993, and incarcerated women (and men) serving longer sentences were given the vote in 2002.

Early History

The cause of women's suffrage began in 1876, when Dr. Emily Stowe came to Toronto to practice medicine. She was the first, and for many years the sole, woman physician in Canada. Stowe, vitally interested in all matters relating to women, at once came before the public as a lecturer upon topics then somewhat new, "Woman's Sphere" and "Women in the Professions," being her subjects. She lectured not only in Toronto, but, under the auspices of various Mechanics' Institutes, in Ottawa, Whitby, and Bradford. After attending a meeting of the American Society for the Advancement of Women, in Cleveland in 1877, and meeting many women of the United States, Stowe, on returning home, felt that the time had arrived for some similar union among Canadian women. Talking it over with her friend, Helen Archibald, they decided that it would not be politic to attempt at once a suffrage association but, in November 1877, organized what was known as "The Toronto Woman's Literary Club".

At the beginning suffragists were typically middle-class White women. These women advocated for suffrage for the sole purpose of boosting their social status resulting in a better society. However, Black abolitionists, unionists, socialists, and temperance activists supported them.

The Toronto Woman's Literary Club

During the next five years, this club had phenomenal growth, adding to its ranks such woman as Mary McDonell (WCTU), Mrs. W. B. Hamilton, Mrs. W. I. Mackenzie, Mrs. J. Austin Shaw, and others. It also elicited a surprising amount of attention from the press. Among the most capable assistants from its very inception was Sarah Anne Curzon, for several years associate editor of the Canada Citizen. It was the habit of the club to meet each Thursday at 3 p.m., at one of the members’ homes. Though not avowedly a suffrage society, no opportunity was lost of promoting this basic idea of the founders. One of the earliest efforts in this direction was a paper, by Archibald, entitled "Woman Under the Civil Law," which elicited discussion and served as educational material. 
During these years, too, mainly through the work of the Woman's Literary Club, the University of Toronto was opened to women. Eliza Balmer was the first female student.

Canadian Women's Suffrage Association

It was believed in 1883 that public sentiment had sufficiently progressed to warrant the formation of a regular Woman-Suffrage Society. On February 1, 1883, the club met and decided the following: "... that in view of the ultimate end for which the Toronto Woman's Literary Club was formed, having been attained, viz., to foster a general and living public sentiment in favour of women suffrage, this Club hereby disband, to form a Canadian Women's Suffrage Association." The following month, on March 5, at a meeting of the City Council, the Toronto Women's Literary and Social Progress Club requested the use of the Council Chambers on March 9. Their purpose was to hold a conversation to discuss the advisability of granting the franchise to those women who possessed the property qualification that entitled men to hold it; and then to proceed to form a suffrage club. Accordingly, on that date, Jessie Turnbull McEwen, then President of the club, was present along with Mayor Arthur Radcliffe Boswell, ex-Alderman John Hallam, Alderman John Baxter, John Wilson Bengough, Thomas Bengough, Thomas Phillips Thompson, and Mr. Burgess, editor of Citizen. The Canadian Woman Suffrage Association was formally inaugurated, and 40 people enrolled themselves as members that evening.

The first piece of work undertaken by the Association was the securing of the municipal franchise for the women of Ontario. On September 10, 1883, a committee was appointed to urge the City Council to petition the Local Government to pass a bill conferring the municipal franchise upon women. The committee consisted of Stowe, McEwen, Mrs. Hamilton, Mrs. Miller, Mrs. Mackenzie, and Mrs. Curzon, with the power to add others. The committee waited upon Hon. Oliver Mowat, who was then the Premier of the Province of Ontario. From the beginning, the members of the Association recognized that it would be manifestly unjust to exclude married women from the exercise of the franchise, bestowing it only on widows and single women. However, it was agreed that it was not politic to criticize the franchise bill before the House, on the principle of 'half a loaf being better than no bread'. Accordingly, objections were set aside, and every woman worked towards securing this partial reform, even though, if married, she would not directly benefit by it.

1880s
In 1882, the Ontario Municipal Act was amended to give married women, widows and spinsters, if possessed of the necessary qualifications, the right to vote on by-laws and some other minor municipal matters. Again, in 1884, the Act was further amended, extending the right to vote in municipal elections on all matters to widows and unmarried women. In the municipal elections in Toronto held on January 4, 1886, women's votes were extremely important and resulted in the election of a candidate pledged to reform, William Holmes Howland.

Another important work accomplished about this time, more or less directly through the influence of the Suffrage Association, was the opening of the Woman's Medical College in Toronto. Stowe (with her friend, Jennie Kidd Trout) had, in the 1870s, forced her way into a season's lectures on chemistry in the Toronto School of Medicine. About 1879, she intimated her intention of entering her daughter, Augusta Stowe, as a medical student. Dr. Augusta Stowe Gullen was awarded her degree of M. D. C. M. in 1883, the first woman to be awarded such a degree under Canadian institutions. As a consequence of the persistence of Stowe and her daughter, other women became aware of the possibilities in the medical profession, and so numerous were the applications for admission that it was deemed expedient to open a Woman's Medical College in Toronto. Gullen was appointed Demonstrator in Anatomy.

After the labour involved in securing the municipal suffrage in 1883, and later, in struggling for the opening of the Woman's Medical College, there was a lull until 1889, when Stowe made arrangements to bring Dr. Anna Howard Shaw to Toronto to lecture. Stowe sent out 4,000 invitations, to every member of Parliament, council, school Board and ministerial association, inviting each member to be present to hear about the Woman Question. The lecture was a success, creating so much interest in the matter that the old suffrage association, which had been practically non-existent for several seasons, was re-organized, with Stowe as president, and Mrs. Curzon as secretary. In December 1889, Susan B. Anthony was secured to lecture in the Woman's Medical College auditorium. She succeeded in increasing interest in suffrage work, until it spread from the women of Toronto to those of surrounding towns, with new groups organizing in many places. Next, the Association secured Mary Seymour Howell, of Albany, New York, to lecture. Mrs. McDonell, ever indefatigable in her zeal for women, accompanied Howell to many towns throughout Ontario, to stimulate suffrage clubs already in existence and to form others.

1890s

In early 1890, it was believed that a Dominion Woman's Enfranchisement Convention might be assembled. This convention was duly announced to be held in Association Hall, Toronto, June 12–13, 1890. Delegates were received from the various Suffrage Clubs then existing. Also, there were representatives from American Clubs, including: Dr. Hannah A. Kimball, Chicago; Rev. Anna Shaw; Mrs. Isabella Hooker, (sister of Henry Ward Beecher), and Mrs. McLellan Brown, lawyer, and president of a Cincinnati college. The papers that elicited most attention were: "The Ballot, its Relation to Economics; " "Woman as Wage-Earner," and "Woman in the Medical Profession." Yellow, the colour of gold, and the symbol of wisdom in the East, was the badge of equal suffragists all over the continent, and was used for decorations at all meetings of the hall. Some of the mottoes used were "Canada's Daughters Should be Free", "No Sex in Citizenship", "Women are half the People", and "Woman, Man's Equal". The Dominion Woman's Enfranchisement Association became duly incorporated.

In 1890, in accordance with the desire of the Equal-Suffragists, Mayor Edward Frederick Clarke and the Toronto City Council determined to invite the Association for the Advancement of Women (A.A.W.), to hold its 18th annual Congress in Toronto. Some of the women who attended and contributed were: Julia Ward Howe, author and litterateur, the friend and associate of Emerson, Longfellow, and Holmes; Mary F. Eastman, one of the leading New England educationists; Alice Stone Blackwell, editor of the Woman's Journal, and daughter of the Rev. Lucy Stone; Clara Berwick Colby, editor of the Woman's Tribune in Beatrice, Nebraska, in 1883; Rev. Florence E. Kalloch, of Chicago; Mrs. Kate Tannatt Woods, journalist and writer.

In 1895, the Equal Suffragists in Manitoba were under the leadership of Dr. Amelia Yeomans. She indicated that the women of the W.C.T.U. were the first to espouse equal suffrage in Manitoba, having twice brought largely signed petitions before the Provincial Legislature. As early as 1872, the statutes in British Columbia were written so as to give married women a vote in municipal matters. By 1895 in Quebec, women for many years had exercised the municipal franchise, although historically, when it was held that a woman would be polluted by entering a polling-booth, it was customary for a notary to call upon the Quebec women in their homes, where they would, in his presence, record their vote without leaving their chair. Prince Edward Island was the only province in Canada in which there was no legislation regarding woman suffrage. Not even the municipal franchise had been conferred for a supermajority of electoral districts. In 1892, amidst deliberations in the 31st General Assembly of Prince Edward Island over the "Bill respecting the Legislature" (popularly known as the "Amalgamation Bill"), Neil McLeod, Leader of the Opposition, attempted to extend provincial suffrage to unmarried women. He prefaced his motion for an amendment to Section 52 of the bill by asking whether "a femme sole [is] a British subject, who has any one of the qualifications contained in sub-sections c, g, h, i, j, k, and l." Frederick Peters, "Leader of the Government" and chair of the Liberal Party, conjectured that the amendment was "simply introduced to gain a little cheap popularity. He has failed to receive this from the male portion of the country and he now strikes out in another line and endeavors to get a little from the females." McLeod, instead of a rejoinder, concluded the doomed motion: "I contend that women are at least as sober, intelligent, and moral as men, and that unmarried women possessing property, and liable to perform statute labor and pay taxes, ought to have the right to vote." Limiting the vote to unmarried women also diminished the frequency of intersections between legitimate children, hyperdescent, and suffrage. In New Brunswick, Sarah Manning, of St. John, was president of the W.E.A. In the Maritime Provinces, Edith Archibald was president of the Maritime W.C.T.U. and was perhaps, the pioneer suffragist of Nova Scotia. Mrs. Leon Owens was president of the Dominion Women's Enfranchisement Association (W.E.A.) of Halifax.

Suffrage continued 

The previously listed events regarding women’s suffrage were only in accordance with White women’s suffrage. Slavery in Canada meant that Black persons were legally deemed chattel property and not considered “people.” Black folks did not possess the rights and freedoms granted to citizens, such as democratic participation. Black persons were slowly being granted rights as British subjects as slavery was gradually being abolished, from 1793-1834. As British subjects, they were entitled to civil rights, but this was extended only to property-owning men, as a gender barrier still existed for all women. Manitoba became the first province to grant the right to vote to women, which extended to both White and Black women. The controversial Wartime Elections Act that passed on September 20, 1917, granted the federal vote to women associated with the armed forces. On May 24, 1918, the Women's Franchise Act was enacted, that granted female citizens over the age of 21 the federal vote, regardless if their province had approved enfranchisement. While women then gained the right to run as Members of Parliament in 1919, Agnes McPhail was not elected to the House of Commons until 1921. The right to vote still had not been granted to Asian and Indigenous women.

In the 19th and 20th century, Asian peoples began immigrating to Canada and were denied the right to vote in both provincial and federal elections. As well, Canadians with Asian heritage were denied the right to vote. In 1920, the Dominion Elections Act was passed by Parliament and it stated that provinces could not discriminate against people based on differences in ethnicity, but this still excluded Canadians of Asian heritage, meaning they were still denied the right to vote. The Dominion Elections Act was rescinded in 1948 and went into effect in 1949. The disenfranchisement of Asian Canadians was finally put to an end after World War II.

In 1920, the Indian Act was amended to allow for “involuntary enfranchisement” for Indigenous men. Only certain Indigenous men were deemed worthy for enfranchisement, such as those with a university degree. There was a poor response to the amendment which resulted in objections from Indigenous communities, which led the amendment to be repealed. Voluntary enfranchisement was introduced after the amendment. In 1960, Parliament passed the Canada Elections Act which granted all registered “Indians'' the right to vote. The intention behind the legislation was threefold. The first factor being that the Canadian government did not want to mirror the actions of the American government in denying African-Americans the right to vote. Secondly, the newly introduced Canadian Bill of Rights made reference to non-discrimination (prior to the Canadian Charter of Rights and Freedoms). Finally, this was seen as a step towards decolonization and increased autonomy for Indigenous communities. As well, until 1985, a First Nations woman marrying a non-First Nations man was automatically enfranchised, as were any children that she may bear. Prior to 1985 this also meant that she her children would lose their official "Indian" status, including the rights to live on a First Nations reserve, although a First Nations man did not lose his status in this way. Once Indigenous peoples became enfranchised, and removed from coverage of the Indian Act, they were granted rights identical to that of other Canadian citizens.

Timeline 

Note: the term "women" used in the table indicate women of age 21 and older. In later years voting was extended to women between 18 and 21 years of age. This change took place federally in 1970.

Notes to table

See also
 Margret Benedictsson, an Icelandic immigrant to Manitoba and prominent suffragist
 List of electoral firsts in Canada.

References

Bibliography

Further reading
 Backhouse, Constance, and David H. Flaherty, eds. Challenging times: The women's movement in Canada and the United States (McGill-Queen's Press-MQUP, 1992).
 Backhouse, Constance B. "Married women's property law in nineteenth-century Canada." Law and History Review 6.2 (1988): 211-257.
 Cleverdon, Catherine L. The Woman Suffrage Movement in Canada (2nd ed. U of Toronto Press, 1974) full text online
 Domareki, Sarah. "Canadian Identity, Women’s Suffrage, and the Rights of Women: A Comparative Analysis of the Stories and Activism of Nellie McClung and Thérèse Casgrain." American Review of Canadian Studies 48.2 (2018): 221-243.
 Fletcher, Ian Christopher, Philippa Levine, and Laura E. Nym Mayhall, eds. Women's suffrage in the British empire: citizenship, nation and race (Routledge, 2012).
 Forestell, Nancy, and Maureen Moynagh. "Mrs. Canada Goes Global: Canadian First Wave Feminism Revisited." Atlantis: Critical Studies in Gender, Culture & Social Justice 30.1 (2005): 7-20. online
 Freeman, Barbara M. Beyond bylines: Media workers and women’s rights in Canada (Wilfrid Laurier Univ. Press, 2011).
 Girard, Philip. "“If two ride a horse, one must ride in front”: Married Women's Nationality and the Law in Canada 1880–1950." Canadian Historical Review 94.1 (2013): 28-54.
 Glassford, Larry. "'The Presence of So Many Ladies': A Study of the Conservative Party's Response to Female Suffrage in Canada, 1918-1939." Atlantis: Critical Studies in Gender, Culture & Social Justice 22.1 (1997): 19-30 online.
 Janovicek, Nancy, and Melanee Thomas. "Canada: Uneven Paths to Suffrage and Women’s Electoral Participation." in The Palgrave Handbook of Women’s Political Rights (Palgrave Macmillan, London, 2019): 169-184.
 Kinahan, Anne-Marie. "Transcendent Citizenship: Suffrage, the National Council of Women of Canada, and the Politics of Organized Womanhood." Journal of Canadian Studies 42.3 (2008): 5-27.
 Sangster, Joan, and Linda Kealey. Beyond the Vote: Canadian Women and Politics (U of Toronto Press, 1989).
 Sawer, Marian, and Jill Vickers. "Women's constitutional activism in Australia and Canada." Canadian Journal of Women and Law 13 (2001): 1+.
 
 Strong-Boag, Veronica. The Last Suffragist Standing: The Life and Times of Laura Marshall Jamieson (2018)
 Strong-Boag, Veronica. "Limiting Identities: The Conservative Attack on History and Feminist Claims for Equality," Labour/Le Travail 73 (Spring 2014): 206-209.
 Strong-Boag, Veronica. "Taking Stock of Suffragists: Personal Reflections on Feminist Appraisals," Journal of the Canadian Historical Association 21:2 (2011): 76-89.

Regional
 Baillargeon, Denyse. To be Equals in Our Own Country: Women and the Vote in Quebec (UBC Press, 2019).
 Brookfield, Tarah. Our Voices Must Be Heard: Women and the Vote in Ontario (UBC Press, 2018).
 Campbell, Gail G. "Canadian women's history: A view from Atlantic Canada." Acadiensis 20#1 (1990): 184-199. online
 Campbell, Lara. A Great Revolutionary Wave: Women and the Vote in British Columbia (UBC Press, 2020).
 Cavanaugh, Catherine, and Randi Warne, eds. Standing on new ground: Women in Alberta (University of Alberta, 1993).
 Cleverdon, Catherine L. The Woman Suffrage Movement in Canada (2nd ed. U of Toronto Press, 1974) full text online; chapters on each province
 Conrad, Margaret. "Addressing the democratic deficit: Women and political culture in Atlantic Canada." Atlantis: Critical Studies in Gender, Culture & Social Justice 27.2 (2003): 82-89. online
 D’Augerot-Arend, Sylvie. "Why So Late? Cultural and Institutional Factors in the Granting of Quebec and French Women's Political Rights." Journal of Canadian Studies 26.1 (1991): 138-165.
 Duley, Margot I. Where once our mothers stood we stand: women's suffrage in Newfoundland, 1890-1925 (Gynergy, 1993).
 Fine-Meyer, Rose. "'A Reward For Working in the Fields and Factories:' Canadian Women's Suffrage Movement as Portrayed In Ontario Texts." Canadian Issues (Fall 2016): 42-47.
 Gosselin, Cheryl. "Remaking Waves: The Québec Women’s Movement in the 1950s and 1960s." Canadian Woman Studies 25.3 (2006) online.
 Gutkin, Harry, and Mildred Gutkin. "'Give us our due!' How Manitoba women won the vote." Manitoba History 32 (1996): 12-25.
 Hale, Linda Louise. "The British Columbia woman suffrage movement, 1890-1917" (PhD dissertation, University of British Columbia, 1977) online.
 Holt, Faye Reineberg. "Women's Suffrage in Alberta." Alberta History 39.4 (1991): 25-31.
 MacDonald, Heidi. "Women’s Suffrage and Confederation." Acadiensis 46.1 (2017): 163-176. online
 McGrath, Ann, and Winona Stevenson. "Gender, race, and policy: Aboriginal women and the state in Canada and Australia." Labour/Le Travail (1996): 37-53. online
 Mahood, Sally. The Women's Suffrage Movement in Canada and Saskatchewan (1971).
 Powell, Sheila. "The opposition to woman suffrage in Ontario, 1872 to 1917." (PhD dissertation, Carleton University, 1987) online.
 Richard, Mallory Allyson. “Exploring the ‘Thirteenth’ Reason for Suffrage: Enfranchising ‘Mothers of the British Race’ on the Canadian Prairies.” in Finding Directions West: Readings That Locate and Dislocate Western Canada’s Past, edited by George Colpitts and Heather Devine, (U of Calgary Press, 2017), pp. 111–132. online
 Risk, Shannon M. "To Be Equals in Our Own Country: Women and the Vote in Quebec." American Review of Canadian Studies 49.3 (2019): 472-478.

Primary sources
 Chemartin, Pierre, and Louis Pelletier. "Clubs, Axes, and Umbrellas: The Woman Suffrage Movement as Seen by Montreal Cartoonists (1910–1914)." in Sketches from an Unquiet Country: Canadian Graphic Satire, 1840-1940 edited by Hardy Dominic, Gérin Annie, and Carney Lora Senechal, (McGill-Queen's University Press, 2018) pp 136–69. online.

 
1916 establishments in Canada